This is a comprehensive list of villages in Saharsa district in Bihar State, India, per the results of the 2011 Census of India.

Nauhatta 

Asnahi Patti	
Auria Ramouti	
Bakaunia
Baksuar
Balwa	
Balugaon urf Chhatra	
Bariyahi bazar
Bangaon	
Bangaon Arazi
Barhara
Bariahi
Bhakua	
Bhelahi
Birjain
Chandrain
Chhataun
Darhar
Deoka
Dibra   
Dhanga
Dharampur
Dharhara
Dumra
Ekarh
Enaetpur
Feqrahi
Garhia
Garhia Lohir
Gobindpur
Hati
Hempur
Kadli patti
Kaithwar
Kaliali
Kasimpur
Kathwar Arazi
Kharka telwa
Kumhrauli
Lalpur
Mahua
Mohammadpur
Mohanpur
Majhaul
Muradpur
Murlipur
Narainpur
Narga
Nauhatta
Naula 
Paliarpur	
Panduba
Parkhotimpur	
Partaha
Rampur	
Rasulpur
Sataur
Shahpur
Tikpuli Chak Khuti Badh

Banma Itahri 

 Afzalpur
 Badshah Nagar
 Deokal
 Ghordaur 
 Hath Mandal
 Itahri
 Jamal Nagar
 Kasimpur
 Khorasan
 Kusmhi 
 Lalpur
 Maharas
 Murli 
 Rasalpur
 Sahuria
 Sarbela
 Shamsuddinpur
 Tarha
 Sugma
Sahuria

Satar Kataiya 

Agwanpur
Aran
Baghi urf Bhaluasukhasan
Baijnathpur
Bara
Barahsher
Bela
Bijalpur
Bishunpur
Chinwari
Dahaha Badh
Gandaul
Ghina
Gangaura Behra
Gobargarha urf jarsain
Hasa Hakpur
Itahri
Kharik Badh
Lachhminia
Laukahi
Makuna
Matiari Badh
Nandlali
Pachgachhia
Padumpur
Panidaha
Patori
Pipra
Purushottam Pur(Purikh)
Rakeapatti
Rohua Arazi
Sadhua Badh
Sattar
Shahpur
Sihaul
Sisai
Tuniahi
Ukahi
 HAKPARA,..

Salkhua 

Alani
Baldehi
Banganwan
Bankatti
Basahi
Bhelwa
Bhirkhi
Chanan
Chhachhua
Chiraia
Gaurdah
Goriyari
Gauri
Gauspur
Gurganwan
Harinsari
Harewa
Kabira
Kabirpur
Kamra
Kathghara
Khajur bana
Khochardewa
Koparia
Kotwalia
Kuchaut
Mamarkha
Puraini
Raingnian
Sahoria
Sahsaili Thuthi
Sahuria
Salkhua
Samhar Kalan
Samhar Khurd
Sauthi
Shahganwan
Situahi
Tajpur
Utesra
Phensaha
Mangaltola
Khograha

Kahra 

Amarpur
Amarpur
Balhapatti
Balhapatti Arazi
Baluaha
Bangaon
Bariahi
Basauna
Bharauli
Bhuswarh Dih
Bishunpur
Bishunpur
Chainpur Uttar Khand
Deojaji
Deona Gopal
Dewari
Dhagjari
Dholi
Dighia
Garahiapatti	
Harpur
Kahra
Kandaha
Kharagpur
Kharagpur
Mohanpur
Murli
Nariyar
Parri
Parwania
Parwania
Patuwaha
Rohua
Rohuamon
Siradipatti
Solindabad
Tulsiahipatti
Dhakjari

Simri Bakhtiarpur 

Agar
Aini
Ashraf Chak
Baghwa
Baidi
Bakhtiarpur
Balhampur
Balhi
Balthi
Baluapar
Barsam
Basatpur
Belwara
Bhagdewa
Bhagwanpur
Bhatauni
Bhauara
Bhorha
Bhotia
Bindpur
Chak Bharo
Chapram
Dhanupra
Ghoghsan
Gopalpur
Hamidpur
Hario
Kantho
Kathdumar
Khajuri
Khamauti
Khoju Chak
Kusmi
Lagma
Madanpur
Madhuban
Mahammadpur
Mahkhar
Manjhwa
Mohanpur
Motihani
Nainpur
Naltigarh
Paharpur
Paharpur
Raipura
Rampur
Saraunja
Saraunja Thana Sitanabad
Sardiha
Shankarpur
Simri
Sisauni
Sonpura
Sukhasan
Tariawan
Teghra
Tilanthi
Turki
Chakmaka

Mahishi 

Aina
Aina Sohagpur
Mahpura
Amahi
Ara
Baghaud
Baghaud
Baghwa
Baghwa Hat Abad
Bahrampur
Balia
Bareta
Bhanthi
Bharwar
Bhelahi Kalan Khurd
Bihna
Bijwar
Birgango 
Birwar
Chatania
Dhanauj
Dhapari
Dharampur
Dhor
Dhor
Dumri
Gamrahu
Gangauni
Garaul
Ghoghpur
Jalai
Jalkaur
Jhara
Jhitki
Kandaha
Kargaon
Karhara
Khairaha
Kodwa
Kundali
kumhara
Lohaur
Mahesraho
Mahishi
Maina
Mahpura
Maina Arazi
Manaur
Mangrauni
murli
Nagar
Naharwa
Nakauch
Nawada
Nonia
Panchbhinda
Paranpur
Parewa
Pastwar
Pokharbhinda
Rajhanpur
Rakhti
Sahorwa
Samani
Sapaita
Sarauni
Simar
Sirwar
Sisauna
Sonkurthua
Supaul
Tarhi
Teghra
Telbadha
Telhar
Telwa
Thanwar

Saur Bazar 

Lilmani gram Khaira
Ajgaiba Roshan Kumar
Baijnathpur
Bakhri
Bancholha
Bansi Rauta
Barahi
Barsam
Barsamkhopatti
Bhabtia
Bhada
Bhagwanpur
Bhulia
Chakla
Chandour
Chikni Dakhinwari
Chikni Darmeani(Boss Tola)
Chikni Uttarwari(Murgi Tola)
Dan Chakla 
Damgadhi
Dham Sena
Gamharia
Garhia
Hanuman Nagar Chakla
Indarwa
Jiwachhpur Pachhiari Patti
Jiwachhpur Purwari
Kabela
Kabela Chak
Kachra
Kachradaun
Kanp
Karahia
Khajuri
Lachhminia
Madhura
Nado
Phursaha
Raghunathpur
Rampur
Rauta Khem
Rohua
Sahuria
Saur
Saur Bazar
Silet
Suhath
Tiri
mushar niya 
Lilmani gram Khaira

Sonbarsa 

Agma
Amirta
Atlakha
Baisa
Baitha Masahri
Balia Ekduari
Barahi
Baraith
Bargaon
Barsam
Basnahi
Behta
Belhat
Bhada
Bhasti
Bhaura
Biratpur
Dahad
Dumra
Durgapur
Fatehpur
Gazi Paita
Goalpura
Goari
Gonram
Harpur
Jalsiman
Jamhra
Jhitkia
Kasnagar
Khajuraha
Kolhait
Kopa
Lagma
Lagma Patti
Mahua Patti Dakhin wari
Mahua Patti Uttarwari
Maina
Malandh Pattiuttarwari
Malaud Patti
Manguar
Manori
Maura	
Mokma
Nanauti
Pacharhi
Pachlakh
Padumpur
Paita
Paman
Pararia
Raghunathpur
Rakhauta
Sahmaura
Sahsaul
Sarauni Madhepura
Shahpur
Sirrahi
Soha
Sonbarsa Raj

Patarghat 

Bara Singhia
Bhaddi
Bishunpur
Dhabauli
Golma
Jalaiya Madhepura tola
Jirwa
Kapasia
Kishunpur
Laxmipur
Paharpur
Pama
Pastpar
Patarghat
Sahgaura
Sahuria
Sakhauri

References

Saharsa